Nezval is a surname. Notable people with the surname include:

Gustav Nezval (1907–1998), Czech actor
Jiří Nezval (born 1941), Czech politician (cs)
Martin Nezval (born 1960), Czech writer (cs)
Vítězslav Nezval (1900–1958), Czech writer

Czech-language surnames
Slavic-language surnames